March 3 - Eastern Orthodox liturgical calendar - March 5

All fixed commemorations below are observed on March 17 by Orthodox Churches on the Old Calendar.

For March 4th, Orthodox Churches on the Old Calendar commemorate the Saints listed on February 19 (February 20 on leap years).

Saints

 Saint Julian of Alexandria, Bishop of Alexandria (189)
 Martyrs Paul and his sister Juliana, and Quadratus, Acacius, and Stratonicus, at Ptolemais in Egypt (273)  (see also: August 17)
 Venerable Gerasimus of Jordan (475)
 Saint Gregory of Constantius in Cyprus, Bishop.
 Saint James the Faster, of Phoenicia, Syria (6th century)

Pre-Schism Western saints

 Saint Lucius I, succeeded St Cornelius as Pope of Rome in 253, and was at once sent into exile.
 Martyrs of Rome, a group of nine hundred martyrs buried in the Catacombs of Callistus on the Appian Way in Rome (260)
 Saint Leonard of Avranches, Bishop of Avranches (ca. 614)
 Saint Owen (Owin), a monk at Lastingham in England with St Chad, then settled at a monastery near Lichfield (ca. 680)
 Saint Basinus, monk and Abbot of St Maximin in Trier in Germany, succeeded St Numerian as bishop of the city (ca. 705)
 Saint Appian, a monk at the monastery of St Peter of Ciel d'Oro in Pavia, became a hermit in Comacchio and brought Christ to that region (ca. 800)
 Saint Adrian of May and Companions, a bishop on the Isle of May in the Firth of Forth in Scotland, martyred by the Danes together with other monks (ca. 875)
 Saint Felix of Rhuys, a monk at Fleury Abbey (Saint-Benoit-sur-Loire) in France (1038)

Post-Schism Orthodox saints

 Saint Gregory, Bishop of Assos near Ephesus (1150)
 Venerable Gerasimus, monk of Vologda, founder of the Holy Trinity Monastery (1178)
 Blessed Basil (Basilko), Prince of Rostov (1238)
 Saints of Pskov martyred by the Latins:
 Saint Ioasaph of Snetogorsk Monastery, and St. Basil of Mirozh Monastery (1299)
 Saint Daniel of Moscow, Great Prince (1303)
 Saint Peter (Michurin), youth of Tobolsk (Peter of Tomsk) (1820)

New martyrs and confessors

 New Hieromartyr Michael Kargopolov, Priest of Krasnoyarsk (1919) 
 New Hieromartyr Dimitry Ivanov of Kiev, Archpriest (1933)
 New Hieromartyr Vyacheslav Leontiev of Nizhegorod, Priest (1937)
 New Martyr John of Al-Sindiyana, Palestine (1937)
 New Hieromartyr Alexander, Priest (1938)

Other commemorations

 Translation of the relics (938) of Martyr Wenceslaus (Vaclav), Prince of the Czechs (935)
 Repose of Schemamonk Mark of Glinsk Hermitage (1893)
 Repose of Schema-Nun Agnia, Eldress of Karaganda (1976)

Icon gallery

Notes

References

Sources
 March 4/March 17. Orthodox Calendar (PRAVOSLAVIE.RU).
 March 17 / March 4. HOLY TRINITY RUSSIAN ORTHODOX CHURCH (A parish of the Patriarchate of Moscow).
 March 4. OCA - The Lives of the Saints.
 The Autonomous Orthodox Metropolia of Western Europe and the Americas (ROCOR). St. Hilarion Calendar of Saints for the year of our Lord 2004. St. Hilarion Press (Austin, TX). p. 19.
 March 4. Latin Saints of the Orthodox Patriarchate of Rome.
 The Roman Martyrology. Transl. by the Archbishop of Baltimore. Last Edition, According to the Copy Printed at Rome in 1914. Revised Edition, with the Imprimatur of His Eminence Cardinal Gibbons. Baltimore: John Murphy Company, 1916. p. 65.
Greek Sources
 Great Synaxaristes:  4 ΜΑΡΤΙΟΥ. ΜΕΓΑΣ ΣΥΝΑΞΑΡΙΣΤΗΣ.
  Συναξαριστής. 4 Μαρτίου. ECCLESIA.GR. (H ΕΚΚΛΗΣΙΑ ΤΗΣ ΕΛΛΑΔΟΣ). 
Russian Sources
  17 марта (4 марта). Православная Энциклопедия под редакцией Патриарха Московского и всея Руси Кирилла (электронная версия). (Orthodox Encyclopedia - Pravenc.ru).
  4 марта (ст.ст.) 17 марта 2013 (нов. ст.). Русская Православная Церковь Отдел внешних церковных связей. (DECR).

March in the Eastern Orthodox calendar